Esperance mallee is an ecoregion on the south coast of Western Australia, a coastal strip where the predominant vegetation consists of short eucalyptus trees and shrubs.

Location and description
A part of the Mediterranean forests, woodlands, and scrub biome, Esperance mallee is an aggregation of the Esperance Plains and Mallee Interim Biogeographic Regionalisation for Australia (IBRA) regions.

Flora
Mallee is a generic term used to describe a number of eucalyptus trees that have an underground bulb called a lignotuber from which new buds can sprout following a forest fire. Mallee trees and accompanying shrubs are thus adapted to the poor soils, lack of rainfall, and regular fires, something common for the dry coast.

Fauna
Wildlife of the coast includes the highly venomous common death adder. Mammals include tiny honey possums (which feed on nectar of the kangaroo paw flowers) and the endangered western quoll. Birds include the endangered western whipbird, western ground parrots, red-winged fairywren, Australian white ibis, and the rare southwestern Cape Barren goose on the coast.

Threats and preservation
Much of the area is used as agricultural land and habitats are threatened by clearance. This is leading to fragmentation, over-irrigation, and wildlife becoming vulnerable to introduced species such as foxes.

Protected areas
A 2017 assessment found that 21,103 km², or 21%, of the ecoregion is in protected areas. Protected areas include Cape Arid National Park, Fitzgerald River National Park, Frank Hann National Park, and Nuytsland Nature Reserve.

References

Further reading
 Thackway, R and I D Cresswell (1995) An interim biogeographic regionalisation for Australia : a framework for setting priorities in the National Reserves System Cooperative Program Version 4.0 Canberra : Australian Nature Conservation Agency, Reserve Systems Unit, 1995. 

Biogeography of Western Australia
Mallee Woodlands and Shrublands
Mediterranean forests, woodlands, and scrub in Australia
Southwest Australia